"The Golf War" is the third episode of the second season of the American animated television series Gravity Falls, created by Alex Hirsch. The episode was written by Jeff Rowe and Hirsch, and was directed by Matt Braly. The episode features Mabel Pines challenge her arch-rival Pacifica Northwest to a mini golf match, with Mabel hiring alive golf balls, called Lilliputtians, to foil Pacifica's game.

The episode premiered on Disney XD on August 11, 2014, and garnered 1.27 million viewers when it premiered.

Plot 
While Dipper watches television at the Mystery Shack, Mabel runs in with a newspaper, excited that she is soon to be in the local newspaper for fashion design. However, Grunkle Stan notices that Mabel's arch-rival, Pacifica Northwest, is instead the front cover. Mabel is saddened by the newspaper. Meanwhile, Soos tries to create a new fashion trend, by creating "W-neck" t-shirts.

While downing shots of orange juice, Mabel hears a television advert promoting a mini golf place. Dipper, knowing that Mabel is an expert at mini golf, offers to take Mabel there to cheer her up. The crew agrees, and heads to the mini golf palace.

Dipper is shown to be terrible at mini-golf, while Mabel shows her extraordinary skill at the game. At the last hole, she tries to hit a hole-in-one to beat her all-time record, but fails to do so. Shortly after, the gang spot Pacifica and her parents at the golf course, with Pacifica openly mocking them. After some arguing, Mabel eventually challenges Pacifica to a match. However, the owner of the course announces that the course has closed. As a compromise, Pacifica then offers that Mabel head down to the course at midnight. She accepts the offer.

At a restaurant, Mabel is demotivated at the fear of losing; however, Dipper convinces her otherwise. The crew arrive at the course, with Grunkle Stan giving Mabel a sticker that says "You Da Best" with a trophy on it. While Mabel is practicing,  Dipper notices a strange sound coming from a windmill on the hole after Mabel fails to hit a single shot. Dipper breaks it open, and finds out that inside, there are alive golf balls, introducing themselves as "Lilliputtians". They control the entire golf course. After figuring out that the Lilliputtians also hate Pacifica, different factions argue that their respective hole is the best. After some fighting, the Lilliputtians decide to let Mabel choose who is the best hole, with the reward being her sticker, capturing the attention of the Lilliputtians. Dipper convinces Mabel to force the Lilliputtians to sabotage Pacifica's game, and let whoever sabotaged her the best be the best hole.

Pacifica eventually arrives, with her being pressured to win at all costs from her parents. Pacifica's referee, Sergei, announces an 18-hole match. With the help of the Lilliputtians, Pacifica is shown to have absolutely terrible results, with Mabel cruising to an easy victory. Mabel claims the miner hole as the best faction, to the dismay of the Dutch hole. The Dutch hole decide to kidnap Pacifica, and tie her to the final hole to kill her. Mabel and Dipper think their plan is going too far. The other factions start to fight once again. Mabel, fueled with anger, decides that no one gets her sticker for fighting. Mabel calls rivalries done, to the surprise of Pacifica. The Lilliputtians eventually decide to work together to then attempt to kill Mabel. Mabel chases to rescue Pacifica, and eventually rescues her. The two fight off the Lilliputtians, and Pacifica starts to like Mabel. Dipper and the two drive away on a golf cart successfully to Grunkle Stan's car. Once outside, Mabel apologizes for cheating, and gives Pacifica a sticker, to which she accepts. While initially refusing to ride in Stan's car, Paciifca gets in after rain starts to fall. Pacifica is disgusted by the car's condition. Eventually, Mabel eventually pulls out two tacos, and Pacifica eventually accepts a taco. The two become friends, and the gang drop her off.

Production 
The episode was written by Gravity Falls creator Alex Hirsch and Jeff Rowe. In addition, the episode was directed by Matt Braly,

Critical reception 
Alasdair Wilkins of The A.V. Club awarded the episode a "B", saying that while the episode represented Gravity Falls at its "absolute weirdness", the episode did not have the tone to keep up the "weirdness".

References 

2014 American television episodes
Gravity Falls episodes
Golf on television